Lot 64 is a township in Kings County, Prince Edward Island, Canada.  It is part of St. Andrew's Parish. Lot 64 was awarded to Colonel Richard Maitland in the 1767 land lottery.

References

64
Geography of Kings County, Prince Edward Island